Temera may refer to:

Temera (fish), a genus of rays in the family Narkidae
Temera, Mali